Mpamantwa is an administrative ward in the Bahi District of the Dodoma Region of Tanzania. In 2016 the Tanzania National Bureau of Statistics report there were 14,111 people in the ward, from 12,984 in 2012.

References

Wards of Dodoma Region